A constitutional referendum was held in Turkey on 16 April 2017 on whether to approve 18 proposed amendments to the Turkish constitution that were brought forward by the governing Justice and Development Party (AKP) and the Nationalist Movement Party (MHP). As a result of its approval, the office of the Prime Minister was abolished and the existing parliamentary system of government was replaced with an executive presidency and a presidential system. The number of seats in Parliament was raised from 550 to 600, while, among a series of other proposals, the president was given more control over appointments to the Supreme Board of Judges and Prosecutors (HSYK). The referendum was held under a state of emergency that was declared following a failed military coup attempt in July 2016.

Early results indicated a 51–49% lead for the "Yes" vote. In an unprecedented move, the Supreme Electoral Council (YSK) allowed non-stamped ballots to be accepted as valid. Some critics of the reform decried this move to be illegal, claiming that as many as 1.5 million ballots were unstamped, and did not recognize the results. Large-scale protests erupted following the results in order to protest the YSK's decision. In subsequent reports, the Organization for Security and Co-operation in Europe (OSCE) and Parliamentary Assembly of the Council of Europe (PACE) both criticized unfairness during the campaign and declared the YSK's decision to be illegal.

An executive presidency has been a long-standing proposal of the governing AKP and its founder, the current President of Turkey, Recep Tayyip Erdoğan. In October 2016, the Nationalist Movement Party (MHP) announced its co-operation for producing draft proposals with the government, with the combined support of both AKP and MHP MPs being sufficient to put forward the proposals to a referendum following a parliamentary vote in January. Those in favour of a "Yes" vote argued that the changes were necessary for a strong and stable Turkey, arguing that an executive presidency would bring about an end to unstable coalition governments that had dominated Turkish politics since the 1960s up until 2002. The "No" campaign have argued that the proposals would concentrate too much power in the hands of the President, effectively dismantling the separation of powers and taking legislative authority away from Parliament. Critics argued that the proposed system would resemble an 'elected dictatorship' with no ability to hold the executive to account, leading effectively to a 'democratic suicide' and autocracy. Three days before the referendum, one of Erdoğan's aides called for a federal system should the "Yes" vote prevail, causing a backlash from the pro-Yes MHP. Both sides of the campaign have been accused of using divisive and extreme rhetoric, with Erdoğan accusing all "No" voters of being terrorists siding with the plotters of the failed 2016 coup.

The campaign was marred by allegations of state suppression against "No" campaigners, while the "Yes" campaign were able to make use of state facilities and funding to organize rallies and campaign events. Leading members of the "No" campaign, which included many high-profile former members of the MHP such as Meral Akşener, Ümit Özdağ, Sinan Oğan, and Yusuf Halaçoğlu were all subject to both violence and campaign restrictions. The "Yes" campaign were faced with campaigning restrictions by several European countries, with the German, Dutch, Danish and Swiss governments all cancelling or requesting the suspension of "Yes" campaign events directed at Turkish voters living abroad. The restrictions caused a sharp deterioration in diplomatic relations and caused a diplomatic crisis between Turkey and the Netherlands. Concerns were also raised about voting irregularities, with "Yes" voters in Germany being caught attempting to vote more than once and also being found to have been in possession of ballot papers before the overseas voting process had started. European election monitors said the vote did not meet international standards.

Background

Introducing a presidential system was proposed by then-Minister of Justice Cemil Çiçek and backed by then-Prime Minister Erdoğan in 2005. Since then, the current presidential system has been openly supported by Justice and Development Party leaders several times, along with a "new constitution". Justice and Development Party vice-president Hayati Yazıcı proposed April 2017 as a date for the referendum.

The parliamentary system formally began transforming into a centralised presidential system after President Recep Tayyip Erdoğan won the July 2018 elections. Since its inception, there have been competing arguments for and against for this transformation.

Constitutional amendments

Initial proposals
On 10 December 2016, the AKP and MHP brought forward a total of 21 proposed amendments to the constitution and began collecting signatures from MPs in order to begin the parliamentary procedures for initiating a referendum. After Assembly Commission talks, 3 proposals were withdrawn, leaving 18 amendments remaining. The full-text proposal in Turkish and the present Turkish constitution are found at the following links. The most important changes have been highlighted by the Union of Turkish Bar Associations.

An English-language summary and interpretation of the 18 amendments is listed in the table below.

Notes

Parliamentary Constitutional Commission

After being signed by the AKP's 316 MPs, the 21 proposed changes were submitted to the Speaker of the Grand National Assembly and were then referred to the Parliamentary Constitutional Commission. The Parliamentary Constitutional Commission, headed by AKP MP Mustafa Şentop, began scrutinizing the proposals in December 2016, earlier than the planned date of January 2017.  The Constitutional Commission is formed of 25 Members of which 15 are from the AKP, 5 are from the CHP, 3 are from the HDP and 2 are from the MHP, as per the composition of parliament. Since the AKP held a large majority of the commission's seats, it was expected by media commentators that there would be minimal surprise developments at the scrutiny stage. Debates in the commission were heated, with occasional fights being observed between MPs.

The Constitutional Commission has the power to amend or reject the proposed changes before they are put to a vote for all MPs. The Commission made minor changes to numerous proposals, such as raising the number of members of the Supreme Board of Judges and Prosecutors from 12 to 13. The commission rejected three of the 21 proposed changes, reducing the constitutional package from 21 proposals to 18. The 5th proposal, which created 'reserve MPs' to take the parliamentary seats that fall vacant between elections, was controversially rejected with just three signatures, well short of the support of 25 commission members or 184 total MPs necessary. It was reported that AKP MPs opposed the creation of 'reserve MPs' on the grounds that it threatened the security of sitting MPs by incentivizing reserves to incapacitate them in order to take their seat. The 15th proposal, giving the President the right to structure the civil service and state institutions through executive decrees, was rejected. A day later on 29 December, the 14th proposal, which gave the right for the President to appoint senior bureaucratic officials, was also rejected.

The Commission completed the approval process on 30 December, rejecting 3 of the 21 proposals in total.

Parliamentary voting

Following the completion of the Constitutional Commission hearings, the 18 proposals were presented to parliament for ratification. Constitutional amendments need a three fifths majority (330 votes) to be put forward to a referendum and a two-thirds majority (367 votes) to be ratified directly. Justice and Development Party (AKP) officials claimed before the vote that even if the 367-threshold was reached, the government would not ratify the changes without a referendum.

Parliament voted on each of the 18 proposals separately in two rounds. The first round served as an indicator of whether the amendments would gather sufficient support, with amendments being proposed by all parties present in the chamber. In the second round, parties are no longer permitted to propose changes to the proposals. The results of the second round are taken into account, with 330 votes needed to send them to a referendum or 367 for direct implementation. A final vote on all of the approved proposals at large, with the same thresholds, was undertaken at the end of the second round, with the entire process being disbanded if votes in favour fell below 330.

Of the total 550 Members of Parliament, 537 were entitled to a vote. 11 MPs from the Peoples' Democratic Party (HDP) were under arrest for terrorism charges and were unable to partake in the vote, with the remaining 48 HDP MPs boycotting the vote after their motion calling for the arrested MPs to be brought to parliament to vote was rejected. The Parliamentary Speaker İsmail Kahraman, who is unable to take part in the vote by virtue of being the Speaker, was hospitalized during the vote, meaning that AKP deputy speaker Ahmet Aydın presided over the proceedings and was therefore unable to cast a vote.

Of the 537 MPs eligible to vote, the AKP held 315, the CHP 133, the MHP 39, the HDP 48 and 2 were independent. Of the MHP's 39 MPs, 6 had openly stated that they would vote against the amendments, leaving the total number of MPs expected to vote "Yes" at 348. The CHP's 133 MPs and the two independents, which consisted of Aylin Nazlıaka and Ümit Özdağ, voted "No" while the HDP boycotted the votes.

Parliamentary voting began on 9 January, with the first round of voting being completed on 15 January. Opposition politicians criticized the rushed way in which the votes were conducted, with four to five votes taking place in a day with no adjournments. The votes were marred by numerous irregularities, with CHP Members of Parliament filming AKP MPs openly casting their vote or intimidating uncertain MPs to vote "Yes". The Minister of Health, Recep Akdağ, was filmed casting an open vote, which is disallowed by the constitution, and openly admitting that he had committed a crime afterwards. AKP MPs responded to attempts to film them with hostility, with fights occasionally breaking out between government and opposition MPs. CHP MP Fatma Kaplan Hürriyet was allegedly strangled by AKP Parliamentary Group Leader Mustafa Elitaş after she filmed Elitaş and Prime Minister Binali Yıldırım casting open votes. Several MPs were hospitalized, while the podium where MPs rose to make speeches was dislocated with one of its €15,000 microphones being reported as missing. The second round of voting was completed on 20 January, with all of the proposed amendments being approved. A final motion to enact the approved amendments was approved by 339 votes, surpassing the 330-vote threshold to hold a referendum but falling short of the 367-vote threshold needed to enact the amendments directly.

Article voting 

Several AKP MPs voted openly for the changes, violating the constitutional requirement of a secret vote.

Reception

The amendments were received with heavy criticism from opposition parties and non-governmental organisations, with criticism focusing particularly on the erosion of the separation of powers and the abolition of parliamentary accountability. Constitutional legal experts such as Kemal Gözler and İbrahim Kaboğlu claimed that the changes would result in the Parliament becoming effectively powerless, while the executive president would have controls over the executive, legislative, and judiciary. On 4 December, the Atatürkist Thought Association (ADD), Association for the Support of Contemporary Living (ÇYDD) and the Trade Union Confederation held a rally in Ankara despite having their permissions revoked by the Governor of Ankara, calling for a rejection of the executive presidential system on the grounds that it threatened judicial independence and secular democratic values.

The amendments were initially received with mixed responses from the opposition CHP, which have long been critical of the AKP's constitutional plans. Shortly after the proposals were made public and submitted to Parliament on 10 December, Prime Minister Binali Yıldırım reported that the CHP was in agreement with 5 of the proposed changes. However, reception by the CHP was negative, with the party's deputy leader Selin Sayek Böke claiming that the proposals essentially created a "sultanate". Parliamentary group leader Levent Gök, one of the first to comment on the released proposals, claimed that the changes would revert 140 years of Turkish parliamentary democracy, calling on all parties to reject the proposals. Another of the CHP's parliamentary group leaders,  Özgür Özel, called the proposals a "regime change", with the parliament being left essentially powerless in scrutinising ministers and holding them to account. Özel claimed that the AKP were unlikely to obtain the 330 votes necessary to put the changes to a referendum, stating that he would be surprised if the number of MPs voting in favour reached 275. CHP MP Selina Doğan claimed that the authoritarian nature of the proposals would effectively end Turkey's EU accession negotiations, citing the lack of any relevance to European values. CHP MP Cemal Oktan Yüksel claimed that the proposals resembled the constitution of Assad's Syria, stating that it wouldn't be a national constitution but "Syria's constitution translated".

Despite having the nationalist MHP's official support, it was reported that Turkish nationalists were also overwhelmingly critical of both the proposals and their party's involvement in their drafting. Bahçeli, who has historically lent support to the AKP in controversial situations, was subject to criticism from all major parties for his decision to support the constitutional amendments, being described as the AKP's "back garden", "life-line" or "spare tyre" by critics. On 24 October 2016, 5 of the 40 MHP Members of Parliament declared that they would reject the constitutional proposals, against their party line. Ümit Özdağ, who was a leadership candidate against Bahçeli and one of the 5 MPs critical of the changes, had his party membership revoked in November. A poll released by Gezici in December showed that almost two-thirds of MHP supporters were against the proposed changes, though MHP supporters were also the most undecided amongst the other parties. On 27 December, MHP MP Kadir Koçdemir became the fifth MP from his party to publicly state his opposition to the proposals.

Speaking shortly after the proposals were released, the HDP's spokesperson Ayhan Bilgen criticized the proposed changes for being anti-democratic and against the principle of judicial independence. Citing the proposed creation of "executive orders" that can be decreed by the President at will without parliamentary scrutiny, Bilgen criticized the nature of the changes, calling them poorly written and an attempt to cover up constitutional violations that had taken place under the current constitution. However, on 18 December, HDP MP Kadri Yıldırım claimed that there would be no reason to reject the proposals if the changes included a separate "status" for Turkish Kurds and a constitutional entitlement to education for Kurdish citizens in their native Kurdish language. This led to speculation that the HDP could be convinced to support the changes by the AKP government, though the MHP would be unlikely to jointly support any changes that are also endorsed by the HDP. On 21 December, the CHP and HDP issued a parliamentary motion that would declare the proposals "unconstitutional", but the motion was rejected by MPs.

The changes have also received severe criticism from outside Turkey. One commentator went as far as to declare that "if a majority votes yes, this will be the end of parliamentary democracy in Turkey." The NGO Human Rights Watch stated that the changes were a "huge threat to human rights, the rule of law, and the country’s democratic future." The Economist concluded that "a vote for Yes would saddle the country with an elected dictator." The Venice Commission of the Council of Europe, in its March 2017 Opinion on the Constitutional amendments, defined them as "a threat to democracy" and stressed the "dangers of degeneration of the proposed system towards and authoritarian and personal regime". Also, before the vote took place, the openDemocracy website reported that some European news outlets published concerns that the 2017 referendum amounted to something like an "enabling act" for Erdoğan.

Campaign positions
Ruling party AKP and opposition MHP are the signatories of the amendments. MHP has provided their conditional support until their conditions are met.
Main opposition CHP's initial position was to wait until the amendments were finalized. CHP leader Kılıçdaroğlu once mentioned of bringing the changes into Grand Assembly. Later, CHP decided to favor No vote and started "Türkiye'yi Böldürmeyeceğiz" (Turkish: We'll not partition Turkey) rallies. Parliament's fourth party HDP is against the changes.

Political parties

NGOs and other groups

Campaigns

"Yes" campaign

The "Yes" campaign has been predominantly led by Justice and Development Party (AKP) politicians, as well as Nationalist Movement Party (MHP) politicians loyal to leader Devlet Bahçeli. Initially expecting a 7 February start to the campaign, the AKP eventually kicked off their official campaign on 25 February with a presentation by Prime Minister Binali Yıldırım at the Ankara sports stadium. Amid poor showings in opinion polls in February, Erdoğan reportedly asked pro-government pollsters to suspend their opinion polling until the end of March, while proposals for a joint electoral rally by both leading AKP and MHP politicians has also been proposed.

The "Yes" campaign has been criticized for its smear campaign against individuals voting "No", associating them with numerous terrorist organisations. Prime Minister Binali Yıldırım claimed that they would vote "Yes" because the Kurdistan Workers Party (PKK) and the so-called Fethullah Gülen Terrorist Organisation (FETÖ) were voting "No", though both organisations have historically been in favour of an executive presidency. President Recep Tayyip Erdoğan also caused controversy when he claimed that those voting "No" were siding with the coup plotters behind the 2016 Turkish coup d'état attempt.

At present, the "Yes" campaign has been conducted through electoral rallies held by Prime Minister Yıldırım, leading AKP politicians and also President Erdoğan, who has held 'public opening' rallies similar to his tactics in the June 2015 general election. MHP leader Devlet Bahçeli has conducted conferences in favour of a "Yes" vote, with the first occurring in Konya on 12 February 2017.

On 10 March, the Great Union Party (BBP) led by Mustafa Destici announced that they would support a "Yes" vote, bringing the total number of parties supporting "Yes" to six. Both the BBP and MHP have suffered serious opposition to their support for a "Yes" vote, with BBP members calling for Destici's resignation following his announcement. The MHP suffered a wave of resignations, inner-party suspensions and a rival "No" campaign run by high-profile nationalist politicians, with opinion polls indicating that a significant majority of MHP voters intend to vote against the proposals. Most polls put the percentage of "No" voters in the MHP at between 50% to 80%, with definite "Yes" voters remaining at 20-25%.  Politicians supporting "No" from both the MHP and BBP have claimed that over 95% of their party supporters are favouring a "No" vote, breaking with their party's executive decision.

"No" campaign

The CHP unveiled their campaign logo and slogan on 28 February, using the slogan 'Geleceğim için Hayır' (translating to For my future, no). The party planned their first electoral rally in Amasya, though preliminary rallies were held by party leader Kemal Kılıçdaroğlu on 21 December 2016 in Adana and by dissident MP Muharrem İnce on 8 March 2017 at Zonguldak. CHP MPs also made a series of overseas visits to rally support from overseas voters, with former leader Deniz Baykal holding an event in France.

High-profile dissident MHP politicians, such as Meral Akşener, Sinan Oğan, Ümit Özdağ, and Yusuf Halaçoğlu all began a "No" campaign based on Turkish nationalism, rivalling the MHP's official "Yes" campaign. The dissident "No" campaign attracted significantly higher popularity than the MHP's official "Yes" events, with opinion polls indicating that an overwhelming majority of MHP voters intend to break the party line and vote "No". In addition to the MHP dissidents, the Turkish Bars Association and its President Metin Feyzioğlu and Leader of "No" Party Leader Tuna Bekleviç embarked on a nationwide tour, intending to meet with locals in numerous towns and villages to rally support for a "No" vote.

"No" campaigners have faced alleged government-backed coercion and suppression. On 1 March, the main opposition Republican People's Party (CHP) unveiled a 78-point report regarding irregularities and suppression of "No" campaigners, with Deputy Leader Öztürk Yılmaz claiming that those who were campaigning for a "No" vote faced fear and state coercion. CHP parliamentary group leader Engin Altay also criticized the government for using state funds to fund the "Yes" campaign while repressing "No" voters, claiming that their conduct did not allow them to talk of 'democracy'.

Controversies and electoral misconduct
Allegations of electoral misconduct, irregularities throughout the campaign and state coercion of "No" supporters were widespread prior to, during and after the referendum. European election monitors said the referendum did not meet international standards.

State suppression of "No" voters
The AKP government and the General Directorate of Security (police) have both been criticized for employing tactics designed to limit the campaigning abilities of "No" supporters, through arrests, control of the media and political suppression. On 23 January 2017, university students campaigning for a "No" vote on a commuter ferry in İstanbul were implicated by security officers for 'insulting the president', with their arrests being stopped by onboard passengers. On 31 January, Republican People's Party council member Sera Kadıgil was arrested and later freed on charges of 'insulting religious values and inciting hatred' for campaigning for a "No" vote on social media. In Bursa, a voter who revealed that he was voting "No" was reported to the police and later arrested. National television channels have been vastly in favour of the "Yes" campaign. One study found that "Yes" supporters received 90% of airtime. A Turkish court banned a pro-Kurdish Peoples' Democratic Party (HDP) song Bejin Na (Say No)  which supported the "No" on the grounds that it contravened the constitution and fomented hatred.

Municipalities held by pro-"Yes" parties have also sought to limit the campaign events of "No" voters by denying them rights to hold rallies in public spaces of community halls. Meral Akşener, a leading nationalist politician and one of the most prominent campaigners for a "No" vote, was stopped from holding speeches when her campaign venues in Yalova and Edirne were abruptly shut down shortly before her events, with posters advertising her events in Eskişehir being ripped down. On 11 February while she was making a speech at a hotel hall in Çanakkale, the venue suffered a power cut and was perceived by the pro-opposition media to be a symbol of the oppressive tactics against the "No" campaign. After initially being obstructed by riot police, attendees at the conference used their phone lights to allow the event to continue.

Overseas "Yes" campaign bans
Overseas election campaigning, even in diplomatic missions, is illegal under Turkish law. Yet, most political parties in Turkey, including CHP and the ruling AKP, have broken the law.

In early March, pro-"Yes" campaigners, including high-profile AKP government ministers were barred from holding campaign events in Germany, Austria, Switzerland, Denmark, and the Netherlands.

Germany
In Germany, local municipalities withdrew permits for Justice Minister Bekir Bozdağ's campaign event in Gaggenau and Economy Minister Nihat Zeybekçi's event in Cologne. While authorities cited security concerns, the insufficient capacities of the rented venues and irregularities in the organisational process, the Turkish government strongly condemned the cancellations and claimed that they were directly linked to an anti-Turkish agenda of the German federal government. Turkish foreign minister Mevlüt Çavuşoğlu claimed that Germany had showed 'double standards' and a disregard for 'human rights and freedom of speech' by cancelling the events. Following a negative reaction by the German federal government to a proposed rally by Recep Tayyip Erdoğan, Erdoğan accused Germany of 'Nazi-style tactics', causing strong condemnation by German officials and a souring of diplomatic relations. The Turkish government also accused Germany of funding and supporting the Kurdistan Workers Party (PKK), which is designated as a terrorist organisation in both countries. Mevlüt Çavuşoğlu was due to meet his German counterpart on 8 March, with scheduled campaign speeches in Hamburg also being cancelled due to irregularities with the venues. Çavuşoğlu therefore made his speech in the Hamburg consulate, despite Turkish law forbidding election campaigns in diplomatic missions. The cancellations in Germany were met by condemnation from the main opposition and pro-"No" Republican People's Party, with former leader Deniz Baykal cancelling a planned visit to Germany as a result.

Diplomatic crisis with the Netherlands

 
A diplomatic crisis occurred between Turkey and the Netherlands on 11 March, after Çavuşoğlu's official plane had its permission to land revoked mid-air ahead of a scheduled campaign speech. Later that day, Families and Social Policy Minister Fatma Betül Sayan Kaya's convoy was stopped by Dutch police, which blocked her access to the Turkish consulate in Rotterdam. Kaya was later declared persona non grata, with a regional state of emergency being declared and her convoy being asked to leave the country. Kaya was therefore forced to return to Germany, while Çavuşoğlu left for France to attend another campaign event. Violent protests by Turkish expats broke out in Rotterdam following the expulsion of both ministers, with the police making 12 arrests.

The Dutch government had previously asked Turkish ministers to refrain from campaigning in the country, fearing that divisive campaign rhetoric would sow divisions within the Turkish community. Prime Minister Mark Rutte claimed that negotiations with the Turkish government to allow a small scale speech by the minister were still ongoing, when Çavuşoğlu publicly threatened with sanctions should ministers be prevented from campaigning. It was these threats that made the situation unsolvable to the Dutch government.

Many people in Turkey took the side of the Turkish government in the matter, with the pro-"No" main opposition announcing their support for the government and calling on the AKP to freeze diplomatic relations with the Netherlands. All CHP overseas campaign events were later suspended in solidarity, while the pro-"No" MHP dissident camp also expressed their condemnation against the Dutch government for their actions. 
In the Dutch parliament all parties, except for the two-seat Denk party, supported the decisions of the Dutch Government. Recep Tayyip Erdoğan reiterated his claim that European governments that suspended campaigning were 'Nazi remnants', which the Dutch government denounced as "unacceptable".

Unstamped ballots
On the referendum day, while the voting was underway, the Supreme Electoral Council of Turkey lifted a rule that required each ballot to have an official stamp. Instead, it ruled that ballots with no stamp would be considered valid, unless there was proof that they were fraudulent. Some claim that because ballots had not only stamps but other security measures  in place, it doesn't make them illegitimate, but no proof whatsoever had been presented for this. The Supreme Electoral Council filed a criminal complaint for the officials that caused the problem by not stamping the ballots. The opposition parties claim that as many as 2.5 million ballots without a stamp were accepted. Opposition parties CHP and HDP have said they will contest the results. CHP leader Kemal Kılıçdaroğlu said that lifting the rule violated Turkish law. According to Meral Akşener, "No" won by 52 percent. The Peoples' Democratic Party contested the election results announced by pro-government Anadolu Agency and insisted that 2.5 million votes without valid stamps should be cancelled.

Opinion polls

Nationwide

Overseas

Results

Overall results

Results by province

Overseas results

Reactions

Sovereign states
  – Foreign Minister Sebastian Kurz expressed his opposition to Turkey's accession to the European Union.
   – President Ilham Aliyev was the first international leader to call the Turkish President, saying that the result demonstrated "the Turkish people's great support" for Erdoğan's policy.
  – President Alexander Lukashenko congratulated Turkey on the successful referendum.
  – Chinese Deputy Prime Minister Liu Yandong, who was visiting Turkey at the time of the referendum, congratulated Erdoğan and the Turkish people on the victory.
  – Government spokesman Nicos Christodoulides said that Cyprus hopes Turkey's stance will move the peace talks forward toward the stated goal of reunifying the island as a federation.
   – President François Hollande stated that the Turkish people have the right to decide how to organize political institutions, but the referendum results show that Turkey is divided about the reforms.
  – Prime Minister Giorgi Kvirikashvili congratulated Turkey on the referendum results and remarked that Turkey's stable development was important to Georgia.
   – Chancellor Angela Merkel said the tight referendum result showed that Turkey is divided and reports over irregularities should be taken seriously. Peter Altmaier, Merkel's chief of staff, said that Germany "would respect a result that came about in a free and democratic vote". Asked if the result was indeed free and democratic, he said he would wait for the verdict of election observers.
   – Iranian Foreign Minister, Mohammad Javad Zarif, extended congratulations to his Turkish counterpart, Mevlüt Çavuşoğlu.
   – Iraqi Vice President Osama al-Nujaifi sent a message to congratulate the Turkish President.
  – President Nursultan Nazarbayev sent a telegram of congratulations to Erdoğan.
  – President Muhammadu Buhari has congratulated the people and government of Turkey on the successful conclusion of the country's referendum.
   – President Mamnoon Hussain and Prime Minister Nawaz Sharif also congratulated the Turkish people on the victory.
   – President Mahmoud Abbas extended congratulations to the Turkish President.
   – Qatar's Emir Tamim bin Hamad Al Thani also congratulated the Turkish President on victory.
  –  President Vladimir Putin called the Turkish President to extend congratulations on behalf of the Russian people.
   – Saudi Arabia's cabinet congratulated Erdoğan and the Turkish people on the successful referendum of constitutional amendments.
  – Somali President Mohamed Farmajo has congratulated the people and government of Turkey on the successful referendum on Turkey's future  
  – President Donald Trump called the Turkish President to congratulate him on the victory.

Regional organisations
   – The Spokesman for European Commission President, Jean-Claude Juncker, expressed concerns over allegations of irregularities in the referendum and called on Turkish civil authorities to launch transparent investigations into the claims.

See also 
 2007 Turkish constitutional referendum
 2010 Turkish constitutional referendum
 2017 Dutch–Turkish diplomatic incident
 2018 Turkish general election
 Media in Turkey
 Democracy

Notes

References

External links 

 Supreme Election Council Official site
 Live referendum Turkey

 
2017 referendums
2017 elections in Turkey
April 2017 events in Turkey
2017
Reform in Turkey
Separation of powers